Orobanche parishii is a species of broomrape known by the common names Parish's broomrape and short-lobed broomrape. It is native to the coast and mountains of California and Baja California, where it is a parasite growing attached to the roots of other plants, usually shrubs of the Asteraceae, such as Menzies' goldenbush (Isocoma menziesii). As a parasite taking its nutrients from a host plant, it lacks leaves and chlorophyll. The inflorescence is a dense cluster of flowers accompanied by dark-veined oval bracts.

References

External links
 Calflora Database: Orobanche parishii (Parish's broom rape)
 Jepson eFlora (TJM2) treatment of Orobanche parishii
USDA Plants Profile
Photo gallery

parishii
Flora of Baja California
Flora of California
Natural history of the California chaparral and woodlands
Natural history of the Channel Islands of California
Natural history of the Peninsular Ranges
Natural history of the Santa Monica Mountains
Natural history of the Transverse Ranges
Least concern biota of Mexico
Taxa named by Willis Linn Jepson